Angus Maxwell Abbey (born 15 November 1925) was an Australian rules football player.  He played with Footscray in the Victorian Football League (VFL), mainly as a defender. He was the unused twentieth man in Footscray's 1954 premiership team. He played his only junior football year with Waratah in the Footscray District League.  His playing measurements were 180 cm and 82.5 kg, which are identical to those of his son Ross who also played for Footscray from 1971 to 1981. He retired from VFL football in 1954, having played 78 games.

References

Holmesby, Russell & Main, Jim (2002) The Encyclopedia of AFL Footballers, Crown Content, Melbourne.

External links
 
 

Western Bulldogs players
Western Bulldogs Premiership players
Australian rules footballers from Victoria (Australia)
1925 births
Living people
One-time VFL/AFL Premiership players